Jérôme Gout is a French former professional rugby league footballer who played in the 2000s and 2010s. He did not play any game during the first season of Toulouse in Championship in 2009 due to a knee injury. He was back in the playing squad for the 2010 season.

References

1986 births
French rugby league players
Living people
Toulouse Olympique players
Rugby league props